SS Himalaya was a British passenger ship of the Peninsular and Oriental Steam Navigation Company, launched in 1948, which operated mainly between Britain and Australia. She was withdrawn from service in 1974 and scrapped the next year.

History

Himalaya was built at Barrow-in-Furness by Vickers-Armstrongs and launched 5 October 1948. She had an identical hull and machinery to the Orient Line's Orcades (yard no. 950 to Himalaya'''s 951), though differing in superstructure and internal layout. She began her service on the Tilbury-Bombay-Australia route in 1949 following her departure from the shipbuilding yard in August. During her commission Himalaya underwent a number of improvements the first of which was, although controversial at the time, a funnel cowl to keep the liner's decks clear of debris without interference to the boilers.

Arthur C. Clarke completed his book, The City and the Stars, on board Himalaya during a voyage to Sydney between September 1954 and  March 1955, as mentioned at the end of the book.

In 1958 she pioneered a new South Pacific route for P&O, from Melbourne and Sydney to San Francisco and Los Angeles via Fiji, Honolulu and Vancouver. The following year she was routed from Los Angeles to Singapore and then onward to London.

In the winter of 1959-60 she was given a major refit by the Rotterdam Drydock Co., which include the installation of full air  conditioning. In 1963, following the sale of the Strath Class liners by P&O, Himalaya, along with Orcades, was converted to all tourist class and was often used on assisted immigrant sailings.Himalaya arrived at Hong Kong on 31 October 1974 on her final commercial voyage. She was sold to Tong Cheng Steel Manufacturing Co. Ltd, and scrapped in Kaohsiung, Taiwan, in 1975.Himalaya was in a background scene, while docked in Hong Kong, in an episode of the series I Spy Season: 01 Ep: 02. A Cup of Kindness.''

See also

References

External links
 photo gallery
 photo gallery

Ships of P&O (company)
Steam turbine-powered ships
Ships built in Barrow-in-Furness
1948 ships